Illubabor can refer to:
Illubabor Province, historic subdivision of Ethiopia
Illubabor Zone, Ethiopia